Cora zapotecorum is a species of basidiolichen in the family Hygrophoraceae. Found in Mexico, it was formally described as a new species in 2019 by Bibiana Moncada, Rosa Emilia Pérez-Pérez, and Robert Lücking. Here it grows as an epiphyte on tree and shrub branches, often around bryophytes and liverworts. It occurs sympatrically with some close relatives: Cora benitoana, C. buapana, and C. marusae. The specific epithet zapotecorum refers to the Zapotec peoples, many of whom now live in the area covered by Oaxaca.

References

zapotecorum
Lichen species
Lichens described in 2019
Lichens of Mexico
Taxa named by Robert Lücking
Basidiolichens